Route 173 is a Connecticut state highway in the southern and western suburbs of Hartford, running from Newington to West Hartford.

Route description
Route 173 begins at an intersection with US 5 and Route 15 in Newington and briefly heads west on Richard Street before turning north onto Willard Avenue. It briefly overlaps with Route 174 and meets Route 175 before continuing into West Hartford, where it becomes Newington Road.  In Elmwood Center, it turns west onto New Britain Avenue, and turns north again onto South Main Street as it meets the northern end of Route 71, onto which New Britain Avenue continues.  It intersects I-84 shortly before ending at an intersection with Hooker Drive.

A section of Route 173 in West Hartford from the Newington town line to SR 529 is designated the Roger Fissette Hannon-Hatch VFW Post 9929 Memorial Highway.  A section from SR 529 to South Main Street in West Hartford is designated the Trooper Carl P. Moller Memorial Highway.

History
Route 173 was commissioned in 1932. It originally went using South Quaker Lane to Farmington Avenue (then Route 4) in West Hartford. In 1962, Route 173 was truncated to end at Route 71. However, in 1969, it was re-extended slightly to I-84 along South Main Street (former SR 569) via a short overlap with Route 71.

Junction list

References

External links

173
Transportation in Hartford County, Connecticut